A Black and White Night may refer to

 Roy Orbison and Friends: A Black and White Night, a television special featuring Roy Orbison
 A Black & White Night Live, an album by Roy Orbison

See also
 Black and White (disambiguation)